Sar Tang-e Darrehi (also Romanized as Sar Tang-e Darreh’ī; also known as Sar Tang) is a village in Hur Rural District, in the Central District of Faryab County, Kerman Province, Iran. At the 2006 census, its population was 57, in 9 families.

References 

Populated places in Faryab County